This is a list of wars involving the Republic of Peru from 1811 to the present.

References

 
Peru
Military history of Peru
Wars
Wars